The following is a list of neighborhoods in Wichita, Kansas, United States.

 A Price Woodard 
 Auburn Hills
 Benjamin Hills
 Brookhollow
 Calfskin Group
 College Hill
 Cottonwood Village
 Country Overlook
 Courtland
 Crestview Heights
 Crown Heights North
 Crown Heights South
 Delano
 Delano Township
 Downtown
 East Front
 East Mt. Vernon
 Eastridge
 El Pueblo
 The Elm
 Fabrique
 Fairfax
 Fairmount
 Forest Hills
 Fox Ridge
 Grandview Heights
 Hilltop
 The Hyde
 Indian Hills
 Indian Hills Riverbend
 Ken-Mar
 La Placita Park
 Lambsdale
 Linwood
 Longview
 MacDonald
 Maple Hills
 Matlock Heights
 McAdams
 McCormick
 Mead
 Meadowlark
 Midtown
 Murdock
 New Salem
 North Riverside
 Northeast Central
 Northeast Heights
 Northeast K-96
 Northeast Millair
 Northwest Big River
 Oakview
 Orchard Breeze
 Orchard Park
 Park Meadows
 Planeview United
 Pleasant Valley
 Power
 Riverside
 Riverview
 Rockhurst
 Schweiter
 Schweiter East
 Sherwood Glen
 Sleepy Hollow
 South Area
 South Central
 South City
 South Seneca United
 Southwest
 Southwest Village
 Stanley/Aley
 Sunflower
 Sunnybrook One
 Sunnyside
 Uptown
 Village
 Westlink

See also
Cities
 Eastborough, Kansas - separate city and enclave of Wichita. It is located in east Wichita.
Census-designated places
 McConnell AFB - It is located in southeast Wichita metro. 
 Oaklawn-Sunview - It is located in southeast Wichita metro.

References

External links
 City of Wichita map - KDOT

Geography of Wichita, Kansas
Neighborhoods in Kansas